Teller Peak is a peak, 3,550 m, marking the northeast extremity of Michigan Plateau and the Watson Escarpment, Queen Maud Mountains. Mapped by United States Geological Survey (USGS) from surveys and U.S. Navy air photos, 1960–63. Named by Advisory Committee on Antarctic Names (US-ACAN) for James T. Teller, geologist with the Ohio State University party to the Horlick Mountains in 1964–65.

Mountains of Marie Byrd Land